Vzglyad (lit. 'Outlook') is a popular Russian TV program, officially broadcast from 2 October 1987 to April 2001. It is one of the first programs that changed Russian notions on television. It is one of the main programs of the television company VID. Vlad Listyev is one of the creators and the first hosts of Vzglyad.

Vzglyad became one of the symbols of perestroika. It shook up the late 80’s soviet public notion of TV broadcasting and journalism in general. The program showed young hosts wearing informal clothing, live broadcasting and used popular music videos as music breaks. All of that was completely opposite to what an average soviet viewer had been used to—strictly rehearsed and censured programs. Vzglyad was widely known and discussed by society and media. It was especially popular among urban youth who represented the interests of the new generation, a generation that wanted change. Usually, hosts invited guests, such as popular political figures or celebrities, and discussed present-day social issues.

Russian journalist Vladimir Mukusev emphasized that the program’s strong side wasn’t the hosts but the guests. He once said in an interview that Vzglyad is not only a story because it influenced the government’s decision-making process. For example, for the first time the first legal Soviet millionaire Artyom Tarasov was shown to public within the walls of Vzglyads studio. A discussion of high prices for party membership cards let to a grand scandal which, in its turn, led to enactment which created the legal basis for the country's transition to a multi-structural economy and a real market.

References

External links

 Сайт Телекомпании ВИD (web.archive)
 Сюжет программы «Взгляд» о коррупции в СССР

Perestroika
1980s Soviet television series
Soviet television shows
1990s Russian television series
2000s Russian television series
Russian television talk shows
Russian television news shows
Channel One Russia original programming